13260 Sabadell, prov. designation: , is a stony Eunomia asteroid from the central region of the asteroid belt. It was discovered by Catalan amateur astronomers Ferran Casarramona and Antoni Vidal at the Montjoia Observatory , Barcelona, on 23 August 1998. It was named after the astronomical society "Agrupació Astronòmica de Sabadell".

Orbit and classification 

Sabadell is a core member of the Eunomia family (502), a large group of S-type asteroids and the most prominent family in the intermediate main-belt. It orbits the Sun in the central main-belt at a distance of 2.1–2.9 AU once every 4 years and 1 month (1,486 days; semi-major axis of 2.55 AU). Its orbit has an eccentricity of 0.16 and an inclination of 13° with respect to the ecliptic. A first precovery was taken at Palomar Observatory in January 1952, extending the asteroid's observation arc by 46 years prior to its official discovery at Montjoia Observatory.

Naming 

This minor planet was named for the well known Catalan–Spanish amateur astronomical society Agrupació Astronómica de Sabadell, which celebrated its 40th anniversary in 2000. Both discoverers are members of this society. The approved  was published by the Minor Planet Center on 26 July 2000. The society uses the Observatorio de Sabadell , one of the country's most prolific amateur observatories, located in a park in the center of Sabadell, near Barcelona, Spain.

Physical characteristics

Lightcurves 

In 2006, a rotational lightcurve was obtained from photometric observations by Italian astronomers Silvano Casulli and Antonio Vagnozzi.

Diameter and albedo 

According to the survey carried out by the NEOWISE mission of NASA's Wide-field Infrared Survey Explorer, the asteroid measures 5.3 kilometers in diameter and has a high surface albedo of 0.31, while the Collaborative Asteroid Lightcurve Link assumes an albedo of 0.21 and calculates a diameter of 6.1 kilometers, as the lower the body's albedo (reflectivity) the higher its diameter, at a constant absolute magnitude (brightness).

References

External links 
 Agrupación Astronòmica Sabadell 
 Asteroid Lightcurve Database (LCDB), query form (info )
 Dictionary of Minor Planet Names, Google books
 Asteroids and comets rotation curves, CdR, Geneva Observatory, Raoul Behrend
 Discovery Circumstances: Numbered Minor Planets (10001)-(15000), Minor Planet Center
 Asteroid 13260 Sabadell, Small Bodies Data Ferret
 
 

013260
Named minor planets
13260 Sabadell
19980823